Áed Ua Conchobair or Áed in Gai Bernaig was the King of Connacht, and reigned from 1046 to 1067. He was the son of Tadg in Eich Gil.

A member of the Ó Conchobhair family, Áed ascended to the throne after King Art of Connacht was killed by the Cinel Conaill in 1046. This was "the second year after his (King Art) having plundered Cluain-mic-Nois."

In December 1061, Áed survived an invasion from a branch of the Uí Briúin dynasty (namely the Síl Cellaigh) which led to the expulsion of the branch to Iar Connacht.

The Muintir Murchadha invaded Loch Oirbsean, and deposed Aedh Ua Conchobhair. The victory of Gleann-Phadraig was gained by Aedh Ua Conchobhair over the people of West Connacht, where many were slain, together with Ruaidhrí. Ó Flaithbheartaigh, lord of West Connacht, was beheaded, and his head was carried to Cruachain in Connacht, after the son of Aedh, son of Ruaidhri, had been defeated.

The same branch, the Muintir Murchada, would later take the life of Áed's son, in May 1062.

Tadhg, son of Aedh Ua Conchobhair, was slain by the son of Aedh, son of Ruaidhrí, and the people of West Connacht.

In 1067, Áed died in battle against Áed Ua Ruairc, who became the next King of Connacht.

Family tree I

     Cathal mac Conchobar mac Taidg, d. 1010.
     |
     |__
     |                   |                            |          |             |                       |
     |                   |                            |          |             |                       |
     Dub Chablaigh       Tadg in Eich Gil, d. 1030.   Brian,     Conchobor,    In Cléirech, fl. 1044.  Tadhg Díreach
    =Brian Boru         =?                           d. 1029      fl. 1029.    |                       |
     |                   |                                                     |_              |
     |                   |                                                     |        |              An Gilla Lónach
     Domnall?            Áed in Gai Bernaig,                                   |        |
     |                     King of Connacht,                                   Tadg,    Conchobar,
     |                        died 1067.                                       d.1056.    d. 1069.
     Diarmait,
     d. 1051.

References

 Leabhar na nGenealach, Dublin, 2004–2005
 Annals of the Four Masters, ed. John O'Donovan, Dublin, 1856
 Annals of Lough Ce, ed. W.M. Hennessey, London, 1871.
 Irish Kings and High Kings, Francis John Byrne, 3rd revised edition, Dublin: Four Courts Press, 2001. 
 Ua Conchobair, Freya Verstraten, in Seán Duffy (ed.), Medieval Ireland: An Encyclopedia. Routledge. 2005. pp. 464–6Ua
 Ua Conchobair, Aid in Gai Bernaig, Ailbhe Mac Shamhrain, in Dictionary of Irish Biography ... to the Year 2002: Volume 9, Staines - Z, 2010, pp. 567–569

1067 deaths
Kings of Connacht
People from County Galway
People from County Roscommon
11th-century Irish monarchs
O'Conor dynasty
Year of birth unknown